The Fur (softcover ) is a science fiction novel by author Nathan Hobby, published in 2004 after winning the 2002 T. A. G. Hungerford Award for unpublished new writers.

Plot summary 

The Fur follows the late high school and early university years of the protagonist Michael Sullivan in an Alternate Reality version of Western Australia in the late 1990s following a meteor strike carrying an infectious and lethal fungus-like plague ('The Fur'). The entire state is under forced quarantine by Commonwealth and UN military forces.

The novel revolves largely around Sullivan's struggles with his religious beliefs and dilemma on whether or not to attempt to break quarantine and start a new life in the uninfected Eastern States of Australia, at the risk of death and certain cost of abandoning his family and friends forever.

Reception 
The journal Reading Time in their review said "this is an uneven, but always interesting novel, one that will appeal to young boys who are feeling their way into adolescense, into deeper relationships with others, and into the questions of idealism, faith and decision making".

References

External links 
 Authors Homepage FAQ and extracts from the book
 Page on Amazon.com
 Book Review by Lisette Kaleveld, Edith Cowan University

2004 Australian novels
2004 science fiction novels
Novels set in Western Australia
2004 debut novels
Fremantle Press books